Chariot Race is a top-down racing game for the VIC-20 home computer published in 1983 by Micro-Antics. Each player attempts to take out the opponent's chariot on the way to the finish. The design, programming, and sound were done by Paul Hope, who died in 2011.

Gameplay
Chariot Race allows two people to play at the same time. Each player races a chariot along the vertically scrolling track while avoiding side walls and oncoming chariots. A player can eliminate the opponent's chariot by pushing it into other chariots or making it crash into the arena walls.

References

1983 video games
VIC-20 games
VIC-20-only games
Top-down racing video games
Multiplayer and single-player video games
Video games developed in the United Kingdom